Parathystas is a genus of moths in the family Cosmopterigidae. It contains only one species, Parathystas porphyrantha, which is found in South Africa.

References

External links

Natural History Museum Lepidoptera genus database

Endemic moths of South Africa
Cosmopteriginae
Taxa named by Edward Meyrick
Monotypic moth genera
Moths of Africa